The 1947 Missouri Tigers football team was an American football team that represented the University of Missouri in the Big Six Conference (Big 6) during the 1947 college football season. The team compiled a 6–4 record (3–2 against Big 6 opponents), finished in third place in the Big 6, and outscored all opponents by a combined total of 240 to 116. Don Faurot was the head coach for the 10th of 19 seasons. The team played its home games at Memorial Stadium in Columbia, Missouri.

The team's statistical leaders included Harold "Bus" Entsminger with 446 rushing yards and 372 passing yards, Mel Sheehan with 218 receiving yards, and Nick Carras with 30 points scored.

Schedule

References

Missouri
Missouri Tigers football seasons
Missouri Tigers football